The 2009–10 season was West Bromwich Albion's 107th season in the Football League. West Bromwich returned to the Championship after being relegated from the Premier League.

Background
West Bromwich continued with English company Umbro as the shirt designers. For the second season running, West Bromwich were unable to find a kit sponsor.

On  16 June 2009, Tony Mowbray left West Bromwich Albion to join Scottish club Celtic as their new manager. He was replaced two weeks later by former Chelsea player Roberto Di Matteo, with the job title changed to head coach.

As part of ongoing ground refurbishments at The Hawthorns, Albion replaced all of the seating in both the Birmingham Road End and Smethwick End with navy blue seats, matching those already fitted in the East and West Stands. The stadium's "iconic" large-scale seat patterns, dating back to the mid-1990s—an italic "Albion" at the Smethwick End and "WBAFC" below a blue and white scarf at the Birmingham Road End—were removed as a result of the work.

Football League Championship 
West Bromwich began their season with a 1–1 draw against Newcastle United. They then travelled to City Ground to play Nottingham Forest, whom they beat, followed by another away win. West Bromwich's second home game was against Ipswich Town, whom they defeated 2–0. This was followed by a draw at Sheffield United. They then came back from against Plymouth Argyle, then beat Doncaster Rovers. West Bromwich then won one of their most remarkable games in a 5–0 win over Middlesbrough, before losing their next two games to Crystal Palace and Barnsley.

The first game of October saw West Brom draw against Preston North End. This was followed by a 3–1 win over Reading. Former Baggie Craig Beattie scored the only goal in a 1–0 loss to Swansea City. This was followed with a 0–0 draw with Coventry City. The Baggies bounced back by thrashing Watford 5–0. A 2–1 win over Leicester City kept the Baggies second. The Baggies trashed Bristol City 4–1, and then became the top goalscorers in the Football League when they humiliated Sheffield Wednesday 4–0, scoring 15 goals in 4 games.

December began with a draw against Derby County, following this with a defeat to promotion rivals Cardiff City and a late draw against QPR. The following two games ended in wins against strugglers Peterborough United and Scunthorpe United. The Baggies then lost to Nottingham Forest, causing the Baggies to drop to third. This was followed by draws to Newcastle United and Ipswich Town. Wins against Sheffield United, Blackpool, Plymouth and Scunthorpe put them top of the table. Cardiff City held West Brom to a 1–1 draw, with Gianni Zuiverloon scoring the equaliser. Bristol City beat them 2–1 but they quickly bounced back with a 3–1 win over Derby County. West Brom started March badly with a 3–1 loss to QPR, but wins against Sheffield Wednesday, Blackpool, Swansea, Preston and Coventry widened the gap between the play-offs and the automatic spots. On-form Reading held the Albion to a 1–1 draw. Playoff hopefuls Leicester City were the next to fall at the Hawthorns, where West Brom won 3–0. Chris Brunt then saved a point for West Brom after Danny Graham put Watford ahead. West Brom secured promotion back to the Premier League after a 3–2 win against Doncaster Rovers on 10 April 2010.

FA Cup
The third round saw West Brom beat League One side Huddersfield Town. West Brom then beat fellow Championship side Newcastle 4–2 in the fourth round to proceed to the fifth round.
They drew with Reading in the fifth round but lost the subsequent replay.

League Cup
In the first round West Bromwich faced League Two side Bury, whom they beat 2–0. In the second round they were taken to extra time by another League Two side, Rotherham United, where Simon Cox scored his first goal for the club. The final score was 4–3. They were knocked out in the third round as they lost 2–0 against Arsenal.

Players
Squad at end of season

First-team squad

Left club during season

Player statistics

|}

Transfers

Summer

In

Out

Winter

In

Out

Loans in

Loans out

Fixtures and results

Pre-season friendlies

Championship

FA Cup

League Cup

See also
 West Bromwich Albion F.C. seasons
 2009–10 Football League Championship

Notes

References

West Bromwich Albion F.C. seasons
West Bromwich Albion